Ramgarh is an upazila of Khagrachari District in the Division of Chattogram, Bangladesh.

History
This was part of ancient Pundra Kingdom.

During the Indo-Pakistani War of 1971 for the liberation of Bangladesh, when Pakistan Army created the 91st ad hoc brigade as part of the 39th Division to hold on to this area and to defend north of Chittagong, but these ad hoc formations lacked the staff and equipment of regular formations. Pakistan Army's 93,000 troops unconditionally surrendered to the Indian Army and India's local ally Mukti Bahini on 16 December 1971. This day and event is commemorated as the Bijoy Dibos in Bangladesh and Vijay Diwas in India.

Geography
It has 9,304 households and total area 240.87 km2.

Demographics
As of the 1991 Bangladesh census, Ramgarh has a population of 44,217. Males constitute 53.01% of the population, and females 46.99%. This Upazila's eighteen up population is 22,854. Ramgarh has an average literacy rate of 29.1% (7+ years), and the national average of 32.4% literate.

Administration
Ramgarh Upazila is divided into Ramgarh Municipality and two union parishads: Pathachhara, and Ramgarh. The union parishads are subdivided into 6 mauzas and 136 villages.

Ramgarh Municipality is subdivided into 9 wards and 29 mahallas.

Wadud Bhuiyan, the former MP and Chairman, Chittagong Hill Tracts Development Board is the famous personality of this upazila as well as district.

See also
Upazilas of Bangladesh
Districts of Bangladesh
Divisions of Bangladesh

References

Upazilas of Khagrachhari District
Bangladesh–India border crossings